The FIS Alpine World Ski Championships 1996 were held 12–25 February in Spain at Sierra Nevada near Granada city. The championships were to be held in 1995, but were postponed due to lack of snow.

Men's competitions

Downhill

Date: February 17

Super-G

Date: February 13

Giant Slalom

Date: February 23

Slalom

Date: February 25

YouTube video - leaders' second runs

Combination

Date: February 19

Women's competitions

Downhill

Date: February 18

Super-G

Date: February 12

Giant Slalom

Date: February 22

Slalom

Date: February 24

Combination

Date: February 19

Medals table
References

External links
FIS-ski.com - results - 1996 World Championships - Sierra Nevada, Spain
FIS-ski.com - results - World Championships

FIS Alpine World Ski Championships
1996
WC
Ski
Alpine skiing competitions in Spain
February 1996 sports events in Europe